Las máscaras (English title:The masks) is a Mexican telenovela produced by Ernesto Alonso and transmitted by Telesistema Mexicano. Original work of Argentine author Carlos Lozano Dana loosely based on the American film All About Eve

Marga López and Joaquín Cordero starred as protagonists, Irán Eory starred as main antagonist.

Cast 
Marga López as Márgara
Joaquín Cordero as Guillermo
Irán Eory as Silvina Cruz
Rita Macedo as Elena
María Rubio as Ida Cruz
José Alonso as Gaspar
Luis Aragón as Zacarías
Ofelia Medina as Delia
Anita Blanch as Blanca
César Castro as Inspector
César del Campo
Beatriz Sheridan
Miguel Gómez Checa

References

External links

Mexican telenovelas
1971 telenovelas
Televisa telenovelas
Spanish-language telenovelas
1971 Mexican television series debuts
1971 Mexican television series endings